Shatter Cave is a cave in Fairy Cave Quarry, near Stoke St Michael in the limestone of the Mendip Hills, in Somerset, England. It falls within the St. Dunstan's Well Catchment Site of Special Scientific Interest.

The name commemorates the damage, done by blasting in the quarry, to some of the decoration within the cave.

Description 
Shatter Cave has been described as being one of the finest decorated caves in Britain in terms of their sheer abundance of pure white and translucent calcite deposits.
Tor Chamber, Portcullis Grottoes and Pisa Passage are also highly decorated.

Access 
The Fairy Caves Management Committee administers the access to this cave on behalf of the quarry owners. In order to protect the calcite formations, novices are not allowed to enter Shatter Cave.

See also 
 Caves of the Mendip Hills

References

External links 
 

Caves of the Mendip Hills
Limestone caves